Seer, SEER, or Seers may refer to:

 Seer, who in ancient Greece practiced divination

Arts and entertainment

 Seer (band), an Austrian music band
 Seer (game series), a Chinese video game and cartoon series
 Seer (film), 2011, based on the game
 Seer, a playable character in the game Apex Legends

People
 Dudley Seers (1920–1983), British economist
 Graham Seers (born 1958), Australian cyclist
 Lindsay Seers (born 1966), British artist 
 Matt Seers (born 1974), Australian rugby league player

Other uses
 Seer (unit), a traditional Asian unit of mass and volume 
 Seer fish, a subfamily of the Scombridae mackerel fish
 Spanish mackerel, or seer fish
 USS Seer (AM-112), an American warship
 Scottish Executive Emergency Room (SEER), renamed Scottish Government Resilience Room
 Seasonal energy efficiency ratio (SEER), measuring the efficiency of air conditioners 
 Surveillance, Epidemiology, and End Results (SEER), a program of the U.S. National Cancer Institute
 Prophet, seer, and revelator, a title in the Latter Day Saint movement

See also
 
 
 Sear (disambiguation)
 Sears (disambiguation)
 Seir (disambiguation)
 Sere (disambiguation)
 The Seer (disambiguation)
 Oracle
 Khirbet Sir, a Palestinian village on the West Bank